George Bass may refer to:

 George Bass (1771–1803), British naval surgeon and explorer of Australia
 George Bass (archaeologist) (1932–2021), American underwater archaeologist
 George Bass (optician)